Hamza Hamry (born 12 January 1995 in Kairouan) nicknamed The Joker, is a Tunisian he is a former judoka and professional mixed martial artist and professional bareknuckle boxer competing in the lightweight division of the BYB Extreme Fighting Series. he is the first fighter that was born and raised in an Arab country to be signed with BYB.

Background 
Hamza Hamry nicknamed "The Joker", was born on 12 January 1995 in Kairouan.

He started sports at the age of ten, and his football experience lasted only two weeks with JS Kairouan. Then he moved to judo and discovered mixed martial arts through a YouTube video.

Mixed martial arts career

Early career
Hamry made his MMA debut 2017 at BFC Algerie, being scheduled to fight Mourad Zaidi. He won the fight by a TKO in the first round.

He was next scheduled to fight Firas Atig at Tataouine Championship, after five years his professional debut. He won the fight by TKO in the first round.

Hamry faced Read El Zanati on 1 April 2022 at Libya Combat Organization. He won the fight via first round TKO.

The fourth battle took place on 15 June 2022 against the Brazilian Dorthy Lucas in Libya, As usual, he dominated the match from the first round, taking advantage of subduing his opponent on the ground And thus made Hamza achieve his fourth victory in a row and Wins the lightweight belt for the International Libya Championship.

Training
Hamza is considered the first Tunisian and Arab fighter to join the American Academy, Jackson Wink, and he is one of the best mixed martial arts academy in the world.

Championships and achievements
 Libya Combat Championship
 Lightweight (One Time)

Mixed martial arts record

|-
| Win
| align=center|4-0
| Dorthy Lucas 
| Submission (Rear-Naked Choke)
|Libya Combat 3 
|
|align=center|1
|align=center|3:09
|Al-Ittihad, Libya
|Won the LBA Combat Lightweight Championship.
|-
| Win
| align=center|3-0
| Read El Zanati 
| TKO (Leg Injury)
|Libya Combat 1
|
|align=center|1
|align=center|1:14
|Tripoli, Libya
|
|-
| Win
| align=center|2–0
| Firas Atig
| TKO (Leg Kicks)
| Tataouine Championships 
|
|align=center|1
|align=center|2:21
| Tunisia, Tataouine
|
|-
|Win
|align=center|1–0
|Mourad Zaidi
|TKO (Punches)
|BFC Algerie 
|
|align=center|1
|align=center|1:45
|Tunisia, Tunis
|
|-

Bare Knuckle Boxing
On February 10, 2023, it was announced that Hamry signed a three-fights contract with BYB Extreme Fighting Series. he is the first fighter that was born and raised in an Arab country to be signed with BYB.

Hamry faced Mark Tiffin on March 18, 2023 at BYB 16: Desert Brawl. He lost the fight via first round TKO.

Bare knuckle boxing record

See also 
 List of male mixed martial artists

References

External links 
 
  
 
 

Living people
1995 births
Tunisian male mixed martial artists
Lightweight mixed martial artists
Mixed martial artists utilizing judo
Mixed martial artists utilizing jujutsu
Tunisian male judoka
Tunisian jujutsuka
21st-century Tunisian people
Bare-knuckle boxers
Tunisian male boxers